This is a list of all major natural disasters in Australian European history. The natural disasters included here are all the notable events which resulted in significant loss of life or property due to natural, non-biological processes of the Earth within Australian territory. Due to inflation, the monetary damage estimates are not comparable. Unless otherwise noted, the year given is the year in which the currency's valuation was calculated. References can be found in the associated articles noted.

See also 
 List of disasters in Australia by death toll
 Bushfires in Australia
 List of major bushfires in Australia
 List of Australian bushfire seasons
 Floods in Australia
 List of earthquakes in Australia
 List of largest fires of the 21st-century
 List of natural disasters in New Zealand

Notes

References 

Natural disasters in Australia
natural disasters
Australia
Disasters in Australia